Norton Tool Co Ltd v Tewson [1972] EW Misc 1 is a UK labour law case, concerning unfair dismissal and the measure of damages as a remedy.

Facts

Judgment
Sir John Donaldson held that loss of pride and injury to feelings may not be compensated. An employee can get damages for (a) immediate loss of wages (b) the manner of dismissal (c) future loss of wages (d) loss of protection for unfair dismissal or redundancy dismissal.

Notes

References

United Kingdom labour case law
1972 in British law
1972 in case law